Nurullah Ataç (21 August 1898 – 17 May 1957) was a Turkish writer, poet and  literary critic.

Life
He was born on 21 August 1898 in Istanbul, then the capital of the Ottoman Empire.  He studied in the Galatasaray High School and the Faculty of Letters of Istanbul University. After his father's death in 1921, he began serving as a French teacher in various schools in Istanbul. After the proclamation of the Turkish Republic he also  served in Ankara and Adana. In 1926 he married Leman Ataç. He was appointed as an official translator of the presidency.  He also served as the chairman of the media branch of the Turkish Language Association. Ataç contributed to several publications, including Yedigün. He died on 17 May 1957 in İstanbul.

In literature
Ataç is known as a productive writer with an excellent memory.  He translated more than 70 books to Turkish. He wrote essays and poems using modern Turkish words (see Modern Turkish). He was a champion of inverted sentences in his writings  In his critics he was often relentless. His books are the following:
1946 – Günlerin Getirdiği (Brought by the days)
1952 – Sözden Söze (From word to word)
1953 – Karalama Defteri (Sketchbook)
1954 – Ararken (While searching)
1954 – Diyelim (Lets say)
1957 – Söz Arasında (During the talks)
1958 – Okuruma Mektuplar (Letters to my reader)
1960 – Günce (Diary)
1961 – Prospero ile Caliban (Prospero and Caliban)
1962 – Söyleşiler (Interviews)
1972 – Günce 1–2 (Diaries 1–2)
1980 – Dergilerde (In the periodicals)

See also
Necmettin Hacıeminoğlu

References

Writers from Istanbul
Turkish male writers
1898 births
1957 deaths
Galatasaray High School alumni
Istanbul University alumni
Turkish schoolteachers
Turkish translators
20th-century translators